The Escadron de Chasse 3/30 Lorraine ("fighter Squadron 3/30 Lorraine") is a fighter Squadron of the French Air and Space Force (Armée de l'air et de l'espace) located at BA 118 Mont-de-Marsan Air Base which flies the Dassault Rafale C.

History 

On June 27, 1944, the Escadron de Chasse 3/30 Lorraine was designated again 3/33 "Lorraine".

On June 18, 1996, the Escadron 3/33 Lorraine was awarded the Fourragere at the colors of the Order of Liberation by the  President of France Jacques Chirac.

The 3/33 Lorraine, placed in a dormant phase in August 2005, was reactivated under the designation of 3/30 "Lorraine" in October 2010 on Aerial Base 104 Al Dhafra (Djibouti–Ambouli International Airport) in the United Arab Emirates to fly the Rafale and the Mirage 2000-5, then only the Dassault Rafale from March 2011.

On December 15, 2015, a Rafale B dropped a SCALP missile for the first time during Opération Chammal over Iraq.

On June 24, 2016, the 3/30 Lorraine was integrated into the 30e Escadre de Chasse and replaced the 1/7 Provence on Saint-Dizier – Robinson Air Base. Only the traditions were transferred, not the personnel nor the aircraft. Accordingly, the aircraft were progressively repainted with the colors of the 3/30. The Escadron was transferred to BA 118 Mont-de-Marsan Air Base during the course of the following weeks.

Escadrilles 
The Escadron is formed of three escadrilles
Until dissolution in 2005 :
 1st Escadrille : Metz (from June 27, 1994, until June 27, 2005)
 2nd Escadrille : Nancy (from June 27, 1994, until June 27, 2005)
 3rd Escadrille : Thionville (from September 1994 until June 27, 2005)

Since reactivation in 2010:
 SAL 56 "Scarabée"
 SPA 38 "Chardon de Lorraine"
 SPA 162 "Tigre" in 2016

Denominations & different designations 

 Groupe Réservé de Bombardement n°1: December 4, 1940 – September 2, 1941
 Groupe de Bombardement n°1 Lorraine: September 2, 1941 – April 7, 1943
 No. 342 Squadron RAF: April 7, 1943 – December 15, 1944
 Groupe de Bombardement I/20 Lorraine: December 15, 1944 – March 11, 1946
 Groupe de Reconnaissance I/20 Lorraine: March 11, 1946 – July 1, 1947
 Groupe de Reconnaissance I/31 Lorraine: July 1, 1947 – November 1, 1949
 Escadron de Chasse de Nuit 1/31 Lorraine: November 1, 1949 – July 1, 1953
 Escadron de Chasse 3/30 Lorraine: July 1, 1953 – March 1, 1962
 Escadron de Chasse Tout-Temps 3/30 Lorraine: March 1, 1962 – December 20, 1973
 Escadron de Chasse 3/30 Lorraine: December 20, 1973 – June 27, 1994
 Escadron de Chasse 3/30 Lorraine: June 27, 1994 – July 26, 2005
 Escadron de Chasse 3/30 Lorraine: Since October 2010

Locations 
From 1961 until 2005, the escadron was successively equipped with Vautour IIN, then Mirage F1, has been deployed on Reims – Champagne Air Base. The latter was reactivated in 2010 on Al Dhafra Air Base, in the United Arab Emirates. In 2016, the Escadron was transferred temporary to Saint-Dizier – Robinson Air Base on June 24, 2016, before joining Mont-de-Marsan Air Base.

 BA 112 Reims – Champagne Air Base (1961 to 2005)
 BA 104 Al Dhafra Air Base (2010 to 2016)
 BA 113 Saint-Dizier – Robinson Air Base (2016)
 BA 118 Mont-de-Marsan Air Base (2016–present)

Aircraft
 Sud Aviation Vautour (1957 to 1974)
 Dassault Mirage F1C (from June 1974 until June 25, 2003)
 Dassault Mirage F1B (from June 1994 until July 26, 2005)
 Dassault Mirage F1CT (from August 2003 until July 26, 2005)
 Dassault Rafale C (October 2010 until present day)

See also

 List of French Air and Space Force aircraft squadrons

References

Bibliography

Fighter squadrons of the French Air and Space Force
Military units and formations established in 1940